Petre Rădulescu (1 July 1915 – 10 September 1980) was a Romanian footballer who played as a goalkeeper and a manager.

International career
Petre Rădulescu played one game at international level for Romania, when he came as a substitute and entered in the 84th minute of a friendly against Sweden.

Honours
Rapid București
Cupa României: 1936–37, 1937–38, 1938–39, 1939–40, 1940–41

Notes

References

External links
 
 
 

1915 births
1980 deaths
Footballers from Bucharest
Romanian footballers
Romania international footballers
Association football goalkeepers
Liga I players
Unirea Tricolor București players
FC Rapid București players
Venus București players
Romanian football managers
Romanian expatriate football managers
FC Universitatea Cluj managers
Syria national football team managers
CS Gaz Metan Mediaș managers